The Egyptian Hope Party is a political party in Egypt created by former members of the Constitution Party. The party plans to run in the 2015 Egyptian parliamentary election.

References

External links
Egyptian Hope Party website

Political parties in Egypt
Political parties established in 2014
2014 establishments in Egypt
Pragmatism